Clathrina pellucida is a species of calcareous sponge from northern Atlantic.

References

Clathrina
Fauna of the Atlantic Ocean
Fauna of Norway
Animals described in 2006